The Biggest Fan is a film featuring the band Dream Street (Chris Trousdale, Jesse McCartney, Matt Ballinger, Frankie J. Galasso and Greg Raposo).  The main characters are Chris Trousdale (playing himself) and his "Biggest Fan" Debbie Worden (Kaila Amariah). It was made in 2002 just before the band split because of the problems between their parents and producers; however, the film's release was postponed pending the outcome of a lawsuit between some of the band members and the band's management.  Chris Trousdale is prominently featured in the film, while the other Dream Street members have cameo roles in the beginning and the end of the film. Trousdale promoted the film at his concerts after filming was complete. The Biggest Fan was released on DVD on May 18, 2005 (USA/Canada) and in 2007 (Australia). The soundtrack was released by Edel.

Plot
Debbie's favorite band is Dream Street, and her favorite member is Chris Trousdale. When Chris gets a fever while travelling on the Dream Street tour, in a haze, he strays away and ends up in Debbie's bed, much to the shock of his "Biggest Fan", who thinks she's in heaven. Debbie proposes that Chris stay with her and he agrees.  So, over the week they spend time together and she secretly hides him so he can escape the pressures of being a pop star for a little while.  Chris even attends high school with Debbie, while disguised as a nerd. Meanwhile, the band's managers are going crazy at the loss of the star, thinking he has been kidnapped. At the end of the week Debbie and Chris (in disguise) go to her high school prom where two jealous popular girls figure out Chris's true identity and tell the police about Chris's whereabouts, splitting him and Debbie up.
They are eventually reunited on stage at a concert, ending in a sweet, final kiss and a performance by Dream Street.

Cast
Actors who appeared in the movie include:

Soundtrack
The soundtrack was released by Sony Music Entertainment through Columbia Records on December 23, 2002. Songs from this release and their eponymous album appear in the film. 3 out of the 11 tracks are from RubyBlue, Dream Street's labelmates from Edel Entertainment.

All songs are performed by Dream Street unless stated and noted.

Notes
  signifies a remixer
 "I Miss You" is sometimes labelled as a 'New Version' since it consist of new vocal even though this is the first time it is released.
 RubyBlue is erroneously credited as "Ruby Blue"

References

External links
 
 
 

2002 films
2002 drama films
American teen films
American teen comedy-drama films
American teen drama films
American teen romance films
American high school films
American docudrama films
Films about music and musicians
2000s English-language films
2000s American films